Niveria quadripunctata is a species of small sea snail, a marine gastropod mollusk in the family Triviidae, the false cowries or trivias.

Distribution

Description 
The maximum recorded shell length is 10 mm.

Habitat 
Minimum recorded depth is 0 m. Maximum recorded depth is 51 m.

References

Triviidae
Gastropods described in 1827
Taxa named by John Edward Gray